Tandin Bidha is a Bhutanese film actress who appeared in a number of films. She has acted in about 32 movies till date. She recently divorced with beatboxer Samten Wangchuk of Shatha. She first appeared in Tse Dhung Chen and recently in the movie A Glimmer of Hope directed by herself currently streaming on Samuh.

She has also dated many shatha members like Ugyen Tshering Tobden, Chador Tenzin Rabgay etc

Biography 
Bidha is a leading Bhutanese film actress and a model.

Filmography

Reality TV Show 
Bidha was one of the speakers or anchors alongside fellow actor Chencho Dorji for The Voice of Bhutan, a national singing competition. She was the voice for Sheldon, a cartoon series and the present from the Prince to the children of Bhutan, initiated by the Prime Minister of Bhutan, Dasho Dr. Lotay Tshering.

References 

Bhutanese actresses
Living people
Year of birth missing (living people)
Place of birth missing (living people)
Bhutanese film people
Bhutanese models